The Vezo is the term the semi-nomadic coastal people of southern Madagascar use to refer to people that have become accustomed to live from sea fishing. The Vezo speak a dialect of the Malagasy language, which is a branch of the Malayo-Polynesian language group derived from the Barito languages, spoken in southern Borneo. They currently populate most of the littoral zone along Madagascar's west coast between Toliara and Mahajanga.

"Vezo" literally means 'the people who fish', but also has been known to mean 'to struggle with the sea'.

Ethnic identity

Vezo do not identify with a particular Malagasy ethnic group but instead with their way of life. They currently populate most of the littoral zone along Madagascar's west coast between Toliara and Mahajanga. Like most other Malagasy ethnic groups, their origins can directly be traced to that original mix of Austronesian settlers from Asia and the Bantu migrants from mainland East Africa. They have been known to state emphatically that they need have no common origin or shared essence with one another. Their identity is contextual and achieved by doing, embodied in learned skills such as fishing or swimming and the callouses they produce, rather than in blood, genes, or skin color. Because of their semi-nomadic marine migrations, their population is difficult to determine and has been estimated by counting the dugout canoes called pirogues (lakanas in Malagasy language) around Madagascar.

History
There are two parts to this history which are relevant to the Vezo view of the environment – how and why the original clans of Andavadoaka left their former village and how they came to choose the site that is now Andavadoaka.
The three clans that established Andavadoaka relocated to avoid the regular invasion by bandits. Marauders from inland tribes regularly attacked the old village a few kilometres north. As pacifists, the Vezo rarely defended their property and were often attacked by others. The villagers wanted an end to these attacks so used their knowledge of local fish to catch poisonous lionfish and gobies, which they cooked and scattered around the village just before the expected attack. After preparing the poison trap, the villagers sailed in their pirogues to the outlying islands to hide from the bandits. Expecting an empty village, knowing the Vezo always flee from attacks, the unsuspecting bandits arrived and ate the food that had been left behind. Many of the bandits died. On returning, the villagers saw the corpses of the poisoned bandits and referred to them as those who had died from eating lionfish (moroy), and from then on referred to the village as the ‘dead of moroy’ or ‘Tratna amy moroy.’ The name of the village to this day is Antsatsamoroy.

Attacks by bandits continue today. In December 2003 to January 2004, March and October 2005 and March to May 2006, cattle rustlers, dahalo or malaso, threatened villagers and stole cattle at pastures in the spiny forest, inland from the village. There have been incidents involving local villagers – one was fatally wounded by shooting after pursuing the armed malaso in the aftermath of a village raid. On each occasion, many of the Vezo villagers put their valuables in their pirogues and send women and children to the outlying islands for safety (in particular, Nosy Hao and Nosy Ve) – sometimes almost completely depopulating the village.

The second part of Andavadoaka's history – how the clans came to choose Andavadoaka – relates to the local landscape. Tired with attacks, the villagers sought a location hidden from both land and sea, where it would be harder for marauders to encounter the village by chance. Their chosen site was a depression in-between surrounding limestone outcrops, on the flattened sand dunes of a sheltered bay. The description given to the location of the village was the depression (lavaka) between the hills. To the east of the village there is a hill riddled with tunnels. The question, ‘lavaka aiza?’ (where is the hole?), and the answer, ‘lavaka vato’ (the hole is in the rock), provided the name for the village – ‘Andavadoaka’.

Society

Vezo-ness is this process of transformation. It is an identity that unfolds through time, rather than being fixed in time.
The Vezo are a fishing people who inhabit a coastal belt extending from Intampolo in the south to Morondava in the north of southwest Madagascar. Andavadoaka is a village whose population are of the Vezo tribe. It has a population of 1,200, with over 50% under 15 years of age. Household income is mainly from fishing. Fishermen make use of mangroves for timber, wood, and fishing. The fishers participate in an artisanal fishery reliant on pirogues (canoes, made by hollowing out a large log) powered by sail and paddle, and most fishing occurs 5 km or less from shore. Men predominantly fish with line, nets, and spears. Women glean the reef flats for invertebrates including octopus and sea cucumbers. Fish sales, processing and trade supplement local income, as does tourism and local commerce.

The Vezo traditionally traded with the neighbouring agro-foresters, the Masikoro. The Vezo also trade with the Mikea, exchanging fish for honey and tubers. However, increased trade has changed the economy from barter to cash-based. Furthermore, growth in fish export from Madagascar has encouraged fish processing and export companies to the region, such as Murex and Copefrito (now operating in the southwest). Their purchases of marine products have increased fish demand and strengthened the cash economy.
Besides gleaning the reef flats, women are the ones who sell the catches that men bring them. With what they earn, women buy rice, the staple food, other essential foodstuff and a variety of luxury items.
Children go to school in the one village school building, where there are two designated teachers. However, due to the deterioration
of public administration in Madagascar, the building and the teachers are hardly ever occupied. Whenever children are in the building, and if the teacher has not run out of chalk, the teaching largely consists in copying letters, numbers, and short sentences from the blackboard onto the child's own A5 size blackboard. Understandably, the many children who do not own a blackboard are allowed to play in the burning heat outside.

Family ties are extremely important among the Vezo and elders are greatly respected in the community. Families often provide for each other with younger members building boats for the elderly to use. Maintaining family ties is important to ensure that one is looked after in old age, or after an accident or ill health. Family relationships are particularly important to Vezo fishers because they determine access to marine resources and fishing gear.

Family affiliation
The Hazomanga is an elder in a family or clan who acts as the intermediary between the ancestors and his family member. His responsibilities include overseeing ceremonies and consulting the ancestors for advice when needed. The most senior village Hazomanga in Andavadoaka is also the village historian and is a member of one of the three founding clans of Andavadoaka. He attends village events when the community considers them to require the permission or consideration of the ancestors. The Hazomanga douses the ground in rum during each consultation with the ancestors. If an occasion is particularly important, local cattle, zebu, may be sacrificed.

Culture
The Vezo have official cultural ceremonies called Fomba. These include Bilo, Tromba, Savatse, Takasy and Soro. All these ceremonies, except Takasy, are practiced (with some variations) by the neighbouring inland Masikoro people.

The circumcision ceremony typically lasts from 4 am until 9 am. The parents ask a wise elder to suggest the best date and time for the ceremony, and identify a nurse or doctor who knows how to perform the circumcision. Family members are invited to attend the ceremony, and one of the uncles holds the child during the ceremony. After the physical cut, there is drinking of alcohol. After the ceremony the child is called savatse.

Fady
The community life of the Vezo, as elsewhere in Madagascar, is guided by numerous fady (taboos). During the course of the life of a Vezo man, he is exposed to the danger of catching hanimboky, a very unpleasant disease that only affects men. The sickness literally means swollen/full with food, which makes it considered thus a male pregnancy. A man sick with hanimboky is unable to go the bathroom and this causes his stomach to swell up until it resembles the belly of a pregnant woman. The illness is caused by food that the male kin of a sexually active woman accepted and ate from her. The food is said to be dirty, for it is assumed that the woman had acquired it with 'tangy', the presents her lover gives her for having sex with him. When a man accepts food from one of his female kin, it is therefore as if he were receiving food from the woman's lover; if a man accepted such food, he would be put in a very inferior position. In essence, they are treated as if they were women by their daughter's or sister's lover.

It is also fady to spill the turtle's blood on the sand.

Funeral rites
Vezo cemeteries lie in the forest, far away from the villages and are so well hidden by the vegetation that they are considered "invisible to the eye". The cemeteries must be hidden in this way because the sight of tombs makes the people sad and unhappy. Cemeteries are not places the Vezo like to visit very often. One does not simply go for a stroll near the cemetery. The living only approach a cemetery when they bear a corpse or when they have to "work" for the dead, such as digging graves and building tombs.

In western Madagascar, Sakalava and Vezo funerary sculpture is renowned internationally for its erotic wooden figures, often depicted during copulation and showing oversized phalluses and breasts. It is unknown as to why the sculptures have this sort of eroticism, but it may have to do with meeting growing tourist demand.

Even after their ancestors have passed, the Vezo keep them involved in many different affairs. Many events in the productive, reproductive and social life of any Vezo family require that the dead be promptly informed, for example if one intends to move to a temporary fishing location, if one is moving into a newly built house or is launching a new canoe, if one is having a difficult birth or if a newborn is brought out of the house for the first time, if one is about to sit a school exam, if difficult words have been spoken which make people's heart heavy with anger, if the visiting anthropologist arrives or leaves, and so on. It is the responsibility of the senior head of the family to call the dead and talk to them, asking for their protection or their forgiveness, and ensuring that they are kept well informed of life's events – for whenever the dead have reasons to be “surprised," they will want to ask questions, thereby causing trouble for the living.

The dead communicate with their living descendants through the dreams that they induce in them. This is because when a person dies, the breathing stops, the body becomes stiff, cold and soon begins to stink and to decompose. But when a person dies, the ‘spirit’ – known as fanahy up to the moment of death – permanently departs from the body. In its new disembodied, ghostly form, the spirit – now known as angatse – is invisible, and moves around like wind. To be seen by living people, it enters their dreams, where it appears together with its original uncorrupted body, just as it was when the person was alive.

Language
The Vezo speak a dialect of the Malagasy language, which is a branch of the Malayo-Polynesian language group derived from the Barito languages, spoken in southern Borneo.

Economy
Off the coast of Madagascar, overfishing has become a major issue. The Vezo rely entirely on fishing, who for the past 2,000 years have been navigating the stretch of the Indian Ocean that separates Madagascar from the African continent in hand-carved pirogues. Increasingly, commercial boats, mostly from Asia and Europe, are fishing those same waters. Thus, it is difficult for the traditional fishermen to compete in the market. In response, many Vezo have resorted to fishing hundreds of miles offshore, spending six to nine months a year in rough and dangerous waters in search of sharks and sea cucumbers, both in high demand in Asian seafood markets. Some bring their families and all their possessions and set up camp on sandbars far from civilization.

Fishermen believe that the current fishing practices have to change by keeping successful skills, removing destructive fishing practices and adopting new fishing technologies. The lack of a system allowing local users to have a shared assessment of the fishing conditions and to define a common vision is the main problem for Vezo traditional fishers. They are so good at tracking the changes in fish catches over time and have a better understanding of the multiple uses of the available habitats but when it comes to pooling their knowledge into one system, they just can not make it by themselves. This shows that traditional ways of solving problems have failed to make its way to modern days. Traditional leaders used to play an important role in preserving wealth of the community by providing guidance to resource users according to the best available judgment. This role has been weakened by several factors including his social status.

Even worse, there is no significant improvement of household revenue in short term by setting up a marine reserve, it is hoped that the approach is likely to bring a much bigger impact on targeted fisheries in a mid and long term exploitation. From a biological point of view, a larger female octopus for example tends to lay many more eggs than young ones. By providing a few more months to grow in a closed fishing ground, it allows octopus individuals to get to bigger sizes.

The Vezo have a long history of subsistence turtle exploitation and associated cultural traditions. By local law, turtles are protected under Decree 24 passed in 1923, but this law has seldom been enforced. The low reproductive potential and delayed sexual maturity of turtles make all species unsuitable for intensive harvest. Even as far back as the early twentieth century, it has been reported that turtles play an important role to Malagasy fisheries. There has been a decline in numbers of the hawksbill turtle and the disappearance of nesting populations. The raiding of the turtle nests and hunting for the meat and carapaces are believed to be the fundamental causes of decline for four of the five species in the region.

A number of interventions are being undertaken to restore fish stocks and sustain the Vezo way of life. ReefDoctor is a key NGO in this effort and has an ongoing programme that aims to enhance fish biodiversity and biomass by the introduction of artificial habitats.

See also

 Demographics of Madagascar
 Andavadoaka

Notes

References

 

 

Bernard Koechlin, Les Vezo du Sud-Ouest de Madagascar. Contribution à l'étude de l'éco-système de semi-nomades marins, Paris/La Haye, Mouton (“Cahiers de l'Homme. Ethnologie- Géographie-Linguistique", Nelle série, vol XV), préface de Georges Condominas, 243 p., cartes, dess., ill., photos., 1975

External links
The Southern Region - very short section on Vezo canoes and burial practices
Photo journal: Shark fishing in Madagascar Jonny Hogg, BBC, ten annotated photographs about the Vezo, "the sea is the most important thing in the world for the Vezo. For most of us, it's our only source of income."
"Voyage of the Vezo" Documentary Film
"Blue Ventures"

African nomads
Ethnic groups in Madagascar
Fishing communities